Trigonopterus pangandaranensis is a species of flightless weevil in the genus Trigonopterus from Indonesia.

Etymology
The specific name is derived from that of the type locality.

Description
Individuals measure 2.65–2.98 mm in length.  General coloration is black, with rust colored legs and head.

Range

Phylogeny
T. pangandaranensis is part of the T. dimorphus species group.

References

pangandaranensis
Beetles described in 2014
Beetles of Asia
Insects of Indonesia